Eric Joris (born 1955 in Antwerp, Belgium) is a Belgian multidisciplinary artist and stage director. In 1991 he founded CREW Eric Joris.

He is a multimedia artist with an initial education in filmmaking, covering many areas such as industrial design, graphic design, comics, visual arts, installation art and last but not least performance art. Under his direction CREW Eric Joris adamantly tries to make performances at the melting point between live art and digital media. Eric Joris has studied at the Royal Academy of Fine Arts (Antwerp) (BE) and the Brussels RITS Institute for Media and Film, languages, art history and economy at Sorbonne, (Paris), Cambridge University (United Kingdom), Heidelberg (Collegium Palatinum) and Tokyo (ETP fundings by European Government).

Eric Joris develops intriguing methods for connecting state-of-the-art technology with artistic forms, often exploring and questioning the human senses, particularly our perception of sound, movement and space particularly. His company CREW Eric Joris generates live-art projects that can be described as immersive theatre, yet those projects move and shapeshift continuously, always operating on the borders between art and science, or beyond the limit of either.

The works of Eric Joris are frequently co-produced and/or sponsored by pioneering institutes for technology, such as Fraunhofer Society and Max Planck Society. He has received eminent prizes and fellowships from the French and Flemish government, as well as from various foundations. CREW Eric Joris is participating in the prestigious program 2020 3D Media, which has secured the backing of the European Commission. CREW is also artistic partner in the EU-funded multidisciplinary research consortium Dreamspace, which develops tools that enable creative professionals to combine live performances, video and computer generated imagery in real time.

He is a mentor of the Forecast Platform 2015-2016, an international platform that promotes emerging talents.

Eric Joris currently lives in Antwerp and works in Brussels.

Productions
 Collateral Rooms, 2016
 C.a.p.e. Drop_Dog , 2016
 Absence, 2015 (Eric Joris and Peter Verhelst), production by CREW Eric Joris and NTGent
 EXPLORER/Prometheus Unchained, 2015 (Eric Joris and Urland), production by CREW Eric Joris and Productiehuis Rotterdam
 C.a.p.e. Anima, 2014 (creation by CREW and Anima Eterna Brugge), conducted by Jos van Immerseel, commissioned by Concertgebouw Brugge
 Centrifuga, 2013
 C.a.p.e. Vooruit/STAM, 2013
 aXes, 2013
 C.a.p.e. KIT, 2013 (Eric Joris and Chantalla Pleiter)
 C.a.p.e. Tohoku, 2012
 NoHorizon, 2012
 C.a.p.e. Pierrefonds, 2010
 BOLSCAN, 2010
 Line-Up, 2009
 EUX, 2009
 W(Double U), 2008
 O_Rex,1.3., 2008
 U_Ranging Standstill, 2006
 Crash, 2004
 Philoctetes, 2002
 Icarus, 2001
 N.M., 2001
 Kammerspiel, 1999
 Kaufhaus Inferno, 1999

References 

Further Reading
 Maaike Bleeker, Jon Foley Sherman, Eirini Nedelkopolou (editors).Performance and phenomenology. Traditions and Transformations, Routledge, 2015. 
 Eric Joris (propos recueilli et trasncrit par Mireille Losco-Lena et Izabella Pluta).LIVE ARTS, LIVE MEDIA, recherche scientifique versus recherche artistique dans le travail de la compagnie CREW (performance company), "Ligeia", 2015
 Eirini Nedelkopoulou, Mary Oliver.Editorial, International Journal of Performance Arts and Digital Media, 10:2, 125-129, DOI:10.1080/14794713.2014.946265,  (Print).
 Catherine Bouko.Interactivity and immersion in a media-based performance, Participations Journal of audience and reception studies, Volume 11, Issue 1.
 Bleumers, L., Van den Broeck, W., Lievens, B., and Pierson, J."Extending the field of view: a human-centred design perspective on 360°TV", Behaviour & Information Technology, 33(8), 800-814, 2014.
 Nele Wijnants.De binnenkant van het beeld: een kunsthistorisch onderzoek naar immersie, theatraliteit en ervaring, Antwerp, Universiteit Antwerpen, Faculteit Letteren & Wijsbegeerte, 2013
 Decock, J., Van Looy, J., Bleumers, L., Bekaert, P.The Pleasure of Being (There?):An Exlorative Study into the Effects of Presence and Identification on the Enjoyment of an Interactive Theatrical Performance using Omni-Directional Video, AI & Society, 2013. 
 Bleumers, L., Lievens, B., Pierson, J."From Sensory Dream to Television Format: Gathering User Feedback on the Use and Experience of Omnidirectional Video-based Solutions", Proceedings of the International Society for Presence Research Annual Conference, Edinburgh, Scotland: Edinburgh Napier University, 2011.
 Sigrid Merx. From doing to performing phenomenology: implications and possibilities, in: Foundations of Science, Vol.16.3, 2011
 Vanhoutte, Kurt. Wijnants, Nele. Performing phenomenology: negotiating presence in intermedial theatre, in: Foundation of Science,  - 16:2-3, pp. 275–284, 2011.
 Klich, R and Scheer, E. Multimedia Performance. Basingstoke: Palgrave, 2011.
 Catherine, Bouko and Natacha, Slater.Identity, Otherness and the virtual double, Technoetic Arts: a journal of speculative research, Vol.9., N°1, pp. 17–30,2011.
 Vanhoutte, Kurt.Two-fold origin: performing hybrids between theatre and media. Contemporary theatre review,  -20:4, pp. 475–485, 2010.
 Vanhoutte, Kurt. Wijnants, Nele.Instance: the work of CREW with Eric Joris Mapping intermediality in performance/Bay-Cheng, Sarah/edit., Amsterdam, 2010, pp. 69–75, .
 Vanhoutte, Kurt. Wijnants, Nele.Pending Presence: negotiating the space inbetween Space cowboys: how art creates, networks and visualises hybrid spaces, Genk, Media and Design Academy, pp. 58–72, 2009.

Sources

External links
 
 
 
 

Belgian theatre directors
Belgian contemporary artists
Artists from Antwerp
1955 births
Living people
Royal Academy of Fine Arts (Antwerp) alumni